Zaterechny may refer to:
Zaterechny (urban-type settlement), an urban-type settlement in Stavropol Krai, Russia
Zaterechny City District, a city district of Vladikavkaz, Republic of North Ossetia-Alania, Russia